S. Ganesan was an Indian politician and former Member of the Legislative Assembly of Tamil Nadu. He was elected to the Tamil Nadu legislative assembly as a Dravida Munnetra Kazhagam candidate from Sembanarkoil constituency in 1967 election, from Kuttalam constituency in 1971 election and from Poompuhar constituency in 1977 election.

References

Members of the Tamil Nadu Legislative Assembly
Living people
Year of birth missing (living people)